Joan-Benjamin Gaba (born 7 January 2001) is a French judoka.

He won a medal at the 2021 World Judo Championships.

References

External links
 

2001 births
Living people
French male judoka
21st-century French people